A long-running debate in computer science known as the Protocol Wars occurred from the 1970s to the 1990s when engineers, organizations and nations became polarized over the issue of which communication protocol would result in the best and most robust computer networks. This culminated in the Internet–OSI Standards War in the late 1980s and early 1990s, which was ultimately "won" by the Internet protocol suite ("TCP/IP") by the mid-1990s and has since resulted in most other protocols disappearing.

The pioneers of packet switching technology built computer networks to research data communications in the early 1970s. As public data networks emerged in the mid to late 1970s, the debate about interface standards was described as a "battle for access standards". An international collaboration between several national postal, telegraph and telephone ("PTT") providers and commercial operators developed the X.25 standard in 1976, which was adopted on public networks providing global coverage. Several proprietary standards also emerged, most notably IBM's Systems Network Architecture.

The United States Department of Defense developed and tested TCP/IP during the 1970s in collaboration with universities and researchers in the United States, United Kingdom and France. IPv4 was released in 1981 and the DoD made it standard for all military computer networking. By 1984, an international reference model known as the OSI model had been agreed on, with which TCP/IP was not compatible. Many governments in Europe – particularly France, West Germany, the United Kingdom and the European Economic Community – and also the United States Department of Commerce mandated compliance with the OSI model and the US Department of Defense planned to transition away from TCP/IP to OSI. 

Meanwhile, the development of a complete Internet protocol suite by 1989, and partnerships with the telecommunication and computer industry to incorporate TCP/IP software into various operating systems laid the foundation for the widespread adoption of TCP/IP as a comprehensive protocol suite. While OSI developed its networking standards in the late 1980s, TCP/IP came into widespread use on multi-vendor networks for internetworking and as the core component of the emerging Internet.

Early computer networking

Pioneers vs PTTs 
Computer science was an emerging discipline in the late 1950s that began to consider time-sharing between computer users and, later, the possibility of achieving this over wide area networks. In the 1960s, Paul Baran in the United States and Donald Davies in the United Kingdom found it hard to convince incumbent telephone companies of the merits of their ideas for the design of computer data networks. AT&T in the United States and the postal, telegraph and telephone service (PTT) in the United Kingdom, the General Post Office (GPO), had a monopoly on communications infrastructure. They believed speech traffic would continue to dominate data traffic and believed in traditional telegraphic techniques. Baran published a series of briefings and papers about dividing information into "message blocks" and sending it over distributed networks between 1960 and 1964. Davies conceived of and named the concept of packet switching in data communication networks in 1965. He proposed a national commercial data network in the UK and built the local-area NPL network to demonstrate and research his ideas. One of the first uses of the term 'protocol' in a data-communication context occurs in a 1967 memorandum entitled A Protocol for Use in the NPL Data Communications Network written by two members of Donald Davies' team, Roger Scantlebury and Keith Bartlett, who were working on protocols for the NPL network. 

Larry Roberts met Roger Scantlebury at the 1967 Symposium on Operating Systems Principles when he presented Davies' work and mentioned the work of Baran. Roberts incorporated Davies' and Baran's ideas about packet switching into the ARPANET design, a project established by the Advanced Research Projects Agency (ARPA) of the United States Department of Defense (DoD) to enable resource sharing between remote computers. The network was built by Bolt, Beranek, and Newman (BBN); the team working on the Interface Message Processor (IMP), which included Bob Kahn, called themselves the "IMP Guys". Like Baran in the mid-1960s, when Roberts approached AT&T in the early 1970s about taking over the ARPANET to offer a public packet switched service, they declined. Louis Pouzin faced opposition from France's PTT, but his ideas to facilitate internetworking caught the attention of the ARPANET developers in the early 1970s.

PTTs were operating on the basis of circuit switching, the alternatives to which are message switching or packet switching.

Datagrams vs virtual circuits 

Packet switching can be based on either a connectionless or connection-oriented mode, which are completely different approaches to data communications. A connectionless datagram service transports packets independently of other packets whereas a connection-oriented virtual circuit transports packets between terminals in sequence. Both concepts have advantages and disadvantages.

Datagram services include the information needed for looking up the next link in the network in every packet. In these systems, the routers examine each packet as it arrives, looks at the routing information within them, and decides where to route it. These have the advantage that there is no inherent overhead in setting up the circuit, meaning that a single packet can be transmitted as efficiently as a long stream. They also generally make routing around problems simpler as only the single routing table needs to be updated, not the routing information for every virtual circuit. This also requires less memory, as only one route needs to be stored for any destination, not one per virtual circuit. On the downside, they need to examine every packet, which makes them (theoretically) slower.

In 1974, Rémi Després introduced the term "virtual circuit" to describe the concept that would later be used in X.25. Virtual circuits emulate physical circuits, which are well understood in the telecoms industry and mimics the operation of their equipment. Once set up, the data packets do not have to contain any routing information, which can simplify the packet structure and improve channel efficiency. The routers are also faster as the route setup is only done once, from then on packets are simply forwarded down the existing link. One downside is that the equipment has to be more complex as the routing information has to be stored for the length of the connection. Another disadvantage is that the virtual connection may take some time to set up end-to-end, and for small messages, this time may be significant.

Building on Donald Davies’ work simulating datagram networks, Louis Pouzin built CYCLADES to research internetworking concepts. He first demonstrated the network, which used unreliable datagrams in the packet-switched network and virtual circuits for the transport layer, in 1973. Under the heading "Datagrams versus VC's", Larry Roberts wrote "As part of the continuing evolution of packet switching, controversial issues are sure to arise."

Common host protocol vs translating between protocols 

At the National Physical Laboratory in the United Kingdom, Donald Davies' team also conducted internetworking research. They considered the "basic dilemma" involved in interconnecting networks; that is, a common host protocol would require restructuring existing networks that used different protocols. To explore this dilemma, the NPL network connected with the European Informatics Network (EIN) by translating between two different host protocols, that is, using a gateway. Concurrently, the NPL connection to the UK Experimental Packet Switched Service used a common host protocol in both networks. NPL research confirmed establishing a common host protocol would be more reliable and efficient.

NCP and TCP vs INWG and X.25 
On the ARPANET, the starting point for connecting a host computer to an Interface Message Processor in 1969 was the 1822 protocol. Steve Crocker said "While much of the development proceeded according to a grand plan, the design of the protocols and the creation of the RFCs was largely accidental." He and other graduate students at UCLA set about designing a host-host protocol known as the Network Control Program. The designers of the NCP envisioned a hierarchy of protocols to enable Telnet and File Transfer Protocol (FTP) functions across the ARPANET. NCP was finalized and deployed in December 1970 by the Network Working Group (NWG), led by Steve Crocker. NCP standardized the ARPANET network interface, making it easier to establish, and enabling more and more DARPA sites to join the network.

Internetworking research in the early 1970s by Bob Kahn at ARPA and Vint Cerf at Stanford University led to the formulation of the first version of the Transmission Control Program (TCP) in 1974, drawing on concepts from prior American, British and French research. Its  specification was written by Cerf with Yogen Dalal and Carl Sunshine in December as a monolithic (single layer) design. The following year, testing began through concurrent implementations at Stanford, BBN and University College London, but it was not installed on the ARPANET at this time.

A protocol for internetworking was also being pursued by the International Networking Working Group, consisting of American researchers, members of the French CYCLADES project, and the British team working on the NPL network and European Informatics Network. INWG members Vint Cerf, Alex McKenzie, Roger Scantlebury and Hubert Zimmermann authored an end-to-end protocol that was presented to the CCITT by Derek Barber in 1975 but was not adopted by the CCITT nor by the ARPANET. The fourth biennial Data Communications Symposium later that year included talks from Donald Davies, Louis Pouzin, Derek Barber, and Ira Cotten about the current state of packet-switched networking. The conference was covered by Computerworld magazine which ran a story on the "battle for access standards" between datagrams and virtual circuits, as well as a piece describing the "lack of standard access interfaces for emerging public packet-switched communication networks is creating 'some kind of monster' for users". At the conference, Louis Pouzin said pressure from European PTTs forced the Canadian DATAPAC network to change from a datagram to virtual circuit approach, although historians attribute this to IBM's rejection of their request for modification to their proprietary protocol.

After leaving ARPA in 1973 to found Telenet, a commercial packet-switched network in the U.S., Larry Roberts joined the international effort to standardize a protocol for packet switching based on virtual circuits shortly before it was finalized. With contributions from the French, British, and Japanese PTTs, including the work of Rémi Després, along with concepts from DATAPAC in Canada, and Telenet in the U.S., the X.25 standard was agreed by the CCITT in 1976. Roberts promoted this approach over the ARPANET model which he described as "oversold" in 1978. Vint Cerf said Roberts turned down his suggestion to use TCP when he built Telenet, saying that people would only buy virtual circuits and he could not sell datagrams. Louis Pouzin remarked that "the PTT's are just trying to drum up more business for themselves by forcing you to take more service than you need."

DoD model vs X.25 and proprietary standards 
The design of the Transmission Control Program incorporated both connection-oriented links and datagram services between hosts. In version 3 of TCP, written in 1978, the Transmission Control Program was split into two distinct protocols, the Internet Protocol (IP) as connectionless layer and the Transmission Control Protocol (TCP) as a reliable connection-oriented service. Originally referred to as IP/TCP, version 4 was installed on SATNET in 1982 and on the ARPANET in January 1983 after the DoD made it standard for all military computer networking. This resulted in a networking model that became known informally as TCP/IP. It was also referred to as the Department of Defense (DoD) model, DARPA model, or ARPANET model.

Computer manufacturers developed proprietary protocol suites such as IBM's Systems Network Architecture (SNA), Digital Equipment Corporation's DECnet, Xerox's Xerox Network Systems (XNS) and Burroughs' BNA. During the late 1970s and most of the 1980s, there remained a lack of open networking options. Therefore, proprietary standards, particularly SNA and DECnet, as well as some variants of XNS (e.g., Novell NetWare and Banyan VINES), were commonly used on private networks, becoming somewhat "de facto" industry standards. By the end of the 1970s, IBM’s networking activities were, by some measures, two orders of magnitude larger in scale than the ARPANET.

The UK Coloured Book protocols gained some acceptance internationally as the first complete X.25 standard. First defined in 1975, they gave the UK "several years lead over other countries" but were intended as "interim standards" until international agreement was reached. The X.25 standard gained political support in European countries and from the European Economic Community (EEC). For example, the European Informatics Network, which was based on datagrams was replaced with Euronet based on X.25. Peter Kirstein wrote that  European networks tended to be short-term projects with smaller numbers of computers and users. As a result, the European networking activities did not lead to any strong standards except X.25, which became the main European data protocol for fifteen to twenty years. Kirstein said his group at University College London was widely involved, partly because they were one of the groups with the most expertise, and partly to try to ensure that the British activities, such as the JANET NRS, did not diverge too far from the US. The growth of public data networks based on the X.25 protocol suite through the 1980s, notably the International Packet Switched Service, created a global infrastructure for commercial data transport. It was supplemented by the X.75 standard, which enabled internetworking. 

In the US, the National Science Foundation (NSF), NASA, and the United States Department of Energy (DoE) all built networks variously based on the DoD model, DECnet, and IP over X.25.

Internet–OSI Standards War 
The early research and development of standards for data networks and protocols culminated in the Internet–OSI Standards War in the late 1980s and early 1990s. Engineers, organizations and nations became polarized over the issue of which standard would result in the best and most robust computer networks. Both standards are open and non-proprietary in addition to being incompatible, although "openness" may have worked against OSI while being successfully employed by Internet advocates.

OSI reference model 
The Experimental Packet Switched Service in the UK in the mid-late 1970s identified the need for defining higher-level protocols. The UK National Computing Centre publication 'Why Distributed Computing', which was based on extensive research into future potential configurations for computer systems, resulted in the UK presenting the case for an international standards committee to cover this area at the ISO meeting in Sydney in March 1977.

Hubert Zimmermann, and Charles Bachman as chairman, played a key role in the development of the Open Systems Interconnections reference model. They considered it too early to define a set of binding standards while technology was still developing since irreversible commitment to a particular standard might prove sub-optimal or constraining in the long run. They had to contend with many competing priorities and interests. The rate of technological change made it necessary to define a model that new systems could converge to rather than standardizing procedures after the fact; the reverse of the traditional approach to developing standards. Although not a standard itself, it was an architectural framework that could accommodate existing and future standards.

The most fundamental idea of the OSI model was that of a “layered” architecture. The layering concept was simple in principle but very complex in practice. The OSI model redefined how engineers thought about network architectures.

Beginning in 1978, international work led to a draft proposal in 1980 and the final OSI model was published in 1984.

Internet protocol suite 
The DoD model and other existing protocols, such as X.25 and SNA, all quickly adopted a layered approach in the late 1970s. Although the OSI model shifted power away from the PTTs and IBM towards smaller manufacturer and users, the "strategic battle" remained the competition between the PTTs' X.25 and proprietary standards, particularly SNA. Until the NSF took over in the 1980s, TCP/IP was not even a candidate for universal adoption. ARPANET was shut down in 1990 and responsibilities for governance shifted away from the DoD.

Philosophical and cultural aspects 

Historian Andrew L. Russell wrote that Internet engineers such as Danny Cohen and Jon Postel were accustomed to continual experimentation in a fluid organizational setting through which they developed TCP/IP. They viewed OSI committees as overly bureaucratic and out of touch with existing networks and computers. This alienated the Internet community from the OSI model. During a dispute within the Internet community, Vint Cerf performed a striptease in a three-piece suit at the 1992 Internet Engineering Task Force (IETF) meeting, revealing a T-shirt emblazoned with "IP on Everything"; according to Cerf, his intention was to reiterate that a goal of the Internet Architecture Board was to run IP on every underlying transmission medium. Cerf said the social culture (group dynamics) that first evolved during the work on the ARPANET was as important as the technical developments in enabling the governance of the Internet to adapt to the scale and challenges involved as it grew.

François Flückiger wrote that "firms that win the Internet market, like Cisco, are small. Simply, they possess the Internet culture, are interested in it and, notably, participate in IETF."

Furthermore, the Internet community was opposed to a homogenous approach to networking, such as one based a proprietary standard such as SNA. They advocated for a pluralistic model of internetworking where many different network architectures could be joined into a network of networks.

Technical aspects 

Russell notes that Cohen, Postel and others were frustrated with technical aspects of OSI. The model defined seven layers of computer communications, from physical media in layer 1 to applications in layer 7, which was more layers than the network engineering community had anticipated. In 1987, Steve Crocker said that although they envisaged a hierarchy of protocols in the early 1970s, "If we had only consulted the ancient mystics, we would have seen immediately that seven layers were required." Although some sources say this was an acknowledgement that the four layers of the Internet Protocol Suite were inadequate.

Strict layering in OSI was viewed by Internet advocates as inefficient and did not allow trade-offs ("layer violation") to improve performance. The OSI model allowed what some saw as too many transport protocols (five compared with two for TCP/IP). Furthermore, OSI allowed for both the datagram and the virtual circuit approach at the network layer, which are non-interoperable options.

Practical and commercial aspects 

Beginning in the early 1980s, ARPA pursued commercial partnerships with the telecommunication and computer industry which enabled the adoption of TCP/IP. In Europe, CERN purchased UNIX machines with TCP/IP for their intranet between 1984 and 1988. Nonetheless, Paul Bryant, the UK representative on the EARN Board of Directors, said "By the time JNT [the UK academic network JANET] came along [in 1984] we could demonstrate X25 ... and we firmly believed that BT [British Telecom] would provide us with the network infrastructure and we could do away with leased lines and experimental work. If we had gone with ARPA then we would not have expected to be able to use a public service. In retrospect the flaws in that argument are clear but not at the time. Although we were fairly proud of what we were doing, I don't think it was national pride or anti USA that drove us, it was a belief that we were doing the right thing. It was the latter that translated to religious dogma." JANET was a free X.25-based network for academic use, not research; experiments and other protocols were forbidden.

The ARPA Internet was still a research project that did not allow commercial traffic or for-profit services. The NSFNET initiated operations in 1986 using TCP/IP but, two years later, the US Department of Commerce mandated compliance with the OSI model and the Department of Defense planned to transition away from TCP/IP to OSI. The major European countries and the European Economic Community endorsed OSI. They founded RARE and associated national network operators (such as DFN, SURFnet, SWITCH) to promote OSI protocols, and restricted funding for non-OSI compliant protocols. However, in 1988, EUnet, the European UNIX Network, announced its conversion to Internet technology. By 1989, the OSI advocate Brian Carpenter made a speech at a technical conference entitled "Is OSI Too Late?" which received a standing ovation. OSI was formally defined, but vendor products from computer manufactures and network services from PTTs were still to be developed. TCP/IP by comparison was not an official standard (it was defined in unofficial RFCs) but UNIX workstations with both Ethernet and TCP/IP included had been available since 1983.

By the beginning of the 1990s, some smaller European countries had adopted TCP/IP. In February 1990, RARE stated "without putting into question its OSI policy, [RARE] recognizes the TCP/IP family of protocols as an open multivendor suite, well adapted to scientific and technical applications." In the same month, CERN established a transatlantic TCP/IP link with Cornell University in the United States. Conversely, starting in August 1990, the NSFNET backbone supported the OSI Connectionless Network Protocol (CLNP) in addition to TCP/IP. CLNP was demonstrated in production on NSFNET in April 1991, and OSI demonstrations, including interconnections between U.S. and European sites, were planned at the InterOp '91 conference in October that year.

At the Rutherford Appleton Laboratory (RAL) in the United Kingdom in January 1991, DECnet represented 75% of traffic, attributed to Ethernet between VAXs. IP was the second most popular set of protocols with 20% of traffic, attributed to UNIX machines for which "IP is the natural choice". In the Central Computing Department Newsletter, Paul Bryant, Head of Communications and Small Systems at RAL, wrote "Experience has shown that IP systems are very easy to mount and use, in contrast to such systems as SNA and to a lesser extent X.25 and Coloured Books where the systems are rather more complex." The author continued "The principal network within the USA for academic traffic is now based on IP. IP has recently become popular within Europe for inter-site traffic and there are moves to try and coordinate this activity. With the emergence of such a large combined USA/Europe network there are great attractions for UK users to have good access to it. This can be achieved by gatewaying Coloured Book protocols to IP or by allowing IP to penetrate the UK. Gateways are well known to be a cause of loss of quality and frustration. Allowing IP to penetrate may well upset the networking strategy of the UK." Similar views were shared by others at the time, including Louis Pouzin. At CERN, François Flückiger reflected "The technology is simple, efficient, is integrated into UNIX-type operating systems and costs nothing for the users’ computers. The first companies that commercialise routers, such as Cisco, seem healthy and supply good products. Above all, the technology used for local campus networks and research centres can also be used to interconnect remote centers in a simple way."

Beginning in March 1991, the JANET IP Service (JIPS) was set up as a pilot project to host IP traffic on the existing network. Within eight months, the IP traffic had exceeded the levels of X.25 traffic, and the IP support became official in November. Also in 1991, Dai Davies introduced Internet technology over X.25 into the pan-European NREN, EuropaNet, although he experienced personal opposition to this approach. The European Academic and Research Network (EARN) and RARE adopted IP around the same time, and the European Internet backbone EBONE became operational in 1992. OSI usage on the NSFNET remained low when compared to TCP/IP. There was some talk of moving JANET to OSI protocols in the 1990s, but this never happened. The X.25 service was closed in August 1997.

The invention of the World Wide Web in 1989 by Tim Berners-Lee at CERN, as an application on the Internet, brought many social and commercial uses to what was previously a network of networks for academic and research institutions. The Web began to enter everyday use in 1993–4. The U.S. National Institute for Standards and Technology proposed in 1994 that GOSIP should incorporate TCP/IP and drop the requirement for compliance with OSI, which was adopted into Federal Information Processing Standards the following year. NSFNET had altered its policies to allow commercial traffic in 1991, and was shut down in 1995, removing the last restrictions on the use of the Internet to carry commercial traffic. Subsequently, the Internet backbone was provided by commercial Internet service providers and Internet connectivity became ubiquitous.

Legacy 
As the Internet evolved and expanded exponentially, an enhanced protocol was developed, IPv6, to address IPv4 address exhaustion. In the 21st century, the Internet of things is leading to the connection of new types of devices to the Internet, bringing reality to Cerf's vision of "IP on Everything". Nonetheless, issues with IPv6 remain and alternatives have been proposed such as Recursive Network Architecture, and Recursive InterNetwork Architecture.

The seven-layer OSI model is still used as a reference for teaching and documentation; however, the OSI protocols originally conceived for the model did not gain popularity. Some engineers argue the OSI reference model is still relevant to cloud computing. Others say the original OSI model doesn't fit today's networking protocols and have suggested instead a simplified approach.

Other standards such as X.25 and SNA remain niche players.

Historiography 

Janet Abbate's book Inventing the Internet was widely reviewed as an important work in the history of computing and networking, particularly in highlighting the role of social dynamics and of non-American participation in early networking development. The book was also praised for its use of archival resources to tell the history. She has since written about the need for historians to be aware of the perspectives they take in writing about the history of the Internet and explored the implications of defining the Internet in terms of "technology, use and local experience" rather than through the lens of the spread of technologies from the United States.

Andrew L. Russell argues scholars could and should look differently at the history of the Internet. His work shifts scholarly and popular understanding about the origins of the Internet and contemporary work in Europe that both competed and cooperated with the push for TCP/IP.

See also 

 History of the Internet

Notes

References

Sources

Further reading

Primary sources

External links 

 
 Internet Histories: Digital Technology, Culture and Society, Routledge

Internet protocols
History of the Internet
Communications protocols
Network protocols
OSI model
X.25